Claire Mathis Anderson (May 8, 1891 – March 23, 1964), native of Detroit, was a silent film actress who worked with stars such as Constance Talmadge, Harry Carey, Thurston Hall, Tom Mix and Gloria Swanson. She was described as one of the original Sennett Bathing Beauties.

Before she became an actress, Anderson worked as a telephone operator in Hudson's department store in Detroit.

Anderson became the first documented double used in film in 1914 when she replaced Blanche Sweet in some scenes of The Escape while Sweet had scarlet fever. She also volunteered to replace a leading lady in a Sennett comedy who refused to enter a lion's cage. After Anderson entered the cage, she received a contract for $675 a week.

Anderson also appeared in the 1944 production of Mexican Hayride at the Winter Garden Theatre in New York City.

She was married to Harry H. Anderson, a "wealthy Hollywood automobile agent".

Selected filmography
 The Story of a Story - 1915
 A Clever Dummy - 1917
 The Hidden Spring (1917)
 The Fly God - 1918
 Who Cares? (1919)
 The Spitfire of Seville (1919)
 Rider of the Law - 1919
 The Fatal Sign - 1920
 The Girl in Number 29 - 1920
 The Palace of Darkened Windows (1920)
 The Path She Chose (1920)
 The Servant in the House - 1921
 When We Were 21 (1921)
 Who Am I? (1921)
 The Yellow Stain - 1922
 The Clean Up (1923)
The Meddler (1925)
 Unseen Enemies (1926)

References

External links

Claire Anderson at Fandango.com

1891 births
1964 deaths
Actresses from Detroit
American silent film actresses
People from Venice, Los Angeles
20th-century American actresses